The Annunciation Church in Denver, Colorado is an historic Catholic parish church at 3601 Humboldt Street.  It is part of the Archdiocese of Denver.

The structure was built during 1904 to 1907 and was added to the National Register in 1990, one of several registered in northeast Denver.

It is built with red brick walls with white cut stone trim.   It has elements of Romanesque Revival and Gothic Revival architecture.  A planned steeple and bell tower were never built, so its highest point is its cross on the roof's peak.  It included stained glass from Mayer and Co. in Munich, Germany.  Its main altar is Carrara marble from Italy.

In popular culture
In 1988, Annunciation Church was featured in the first season of Father Dowling Mysteries, standing in for the main character's church, "St. Michael's."

References

Roman Catholic churches in Denver
Roman Catholic churches completed in 1904
Churches on the National Register of Historic Places in Colorado
Gothic Revival church buildings in Colorado
Romanesque Revival church buildings in Colorado
National Register of Historic Places in Denver
20th-century Roman Catholic church buildings in the United States